Vecvagars (feminine: Vecvagare) is a Latvian occupational surname, derived from the Latvian words  ("old)" and   ("overseer"). Individuals with the surname include:

 Arnis Vecvagars (born 1974), Latvian retired basketball player and current manager of Latvian national basketball team;
 Kaspars Vecvagars (born 1993), Latvian basketball player

Occupational surnames
Latvian-language masculine surnames